Kedarnath Agarwal (also spelled as Agrawal and Aggarwal; 1911–2000) was a Hindi language poet and writer.

Published work 

Agarwal's published books are:
 Yug Ki Ganga
 Neend Ke Badal
 Lok Aur Alok
 Phool nahin Rang Bolte Hain
 Aag Ka Aayeena
 Bambay ka Raktasnan
 Gulmehndi
 Pankh aur Patwar
 Mar Pyar ki Thapein
 He Meri Tum
 Kahein Kedar Khari Khari
 Apoorva
 Vah Chidiya Jo
 Jamun Jal Tumzsa
 Bole Bol Abol
 Jo Shilayein Todte Hain
 Aatma Gandh
 Anhari Haryali
 Khuli Aankhein Khuli Daine

References

External links 
 Kedarnath Agarwal at Kavita Kosh (Hindi)
  English translation of a poem 
  All Poems of Kedar Nath Agrawal at Hindi Sahitya 

1911 births
2000 deaths
Hindi-language writers
Hindi-language poets
Recipients of the Sahitya Akademi Award in Hindi
People from Banda district, India
20th-century Indian poets
Poets from Uttar Pradesh
Indian male poets
20th-century Indian male writers